Methylumbelliferone may refer to:

 4-Methylumbelliferone (hymecromone)
 7-O-Methylumbelliferone (herniarin)